Hebatallah El-Wazan (born September 14, 1976) is an Egyptian Olympic shooter. She represented Egypt in 2000 in Sydney.

Olympic participation

Sydney 2000 

Shooting

External links 
 
 Hebatallah El-Wazan at issf-sports.org

References 

1976 births
Egyptian female sport shooters
Olympic shooters of Egypt
Shooters at the 2000 Summer Olympics
Living people
21st-century Egyptian women